Nicolai Stokholm (born 1 April 1976) is a Danish former professional association footballer, who played as a midfielder. He played for FC Nordsjælland, having moved from Viking FK in the winter 2008–09. He made his debut for the Denmark national team in the March 2006 1–0 friendly win against Israel.

Honours
F.C. Nordsjælland
 Danish Superliga: 2011–12
 Danish Cup: 2009–10, 2010–11

External links
 Profile at FCN.dk 
 
 OB profile
 Career stats, by Danmarks Radio

1976 births
Living people
Danish men's footballers
Association football midfielders
Denmark international footballers
Holbæk B&I players
Akademisk Boldklub players
Odense Boldklub players
Viking FK players
FC Nordsjælland players
Danish Superliga players
Eliteserien players
Danish expatriate men's footballers
Danish expatriate sportspeople in Norway
Expatriate footballers in Norway